The 2019–20 FC Schalke 04 season was the 116th season in the football club's history and 29th consecutive and 52nd overall season in the top flight of German football, the Bundesliga, having been promoted from the 2. Bundesliga in 1991. In addition to the domestic league, Schalke 04 also were participating in this season's editions of the domestic cup, the DFB-Pokal. This was the 19th season for Schalke in the Veltins-Arena, located in Gelsenkirchen, North Rhine-Westphalia. The season covered a period from 1 July 2019 to 30 June 2020. As a result of the COVID-19 pandemic, Schalke 04 did not play a match between 7 March and 16 May 2020, and their last nine Bundesliga games were played behind closed doors.

Players

Note: Players' appearances and goals only in their Schalke career.
.

Transfers

In

Out

Club

Kit
Supplier: Umbro / Sponsor: Gazprom

Friendly matches

Competitions

Overview

Bundesliga

League table

Results summary

Results by round

Matches
The Bundesliga schedule was announced on 28 June 2019.

DFB-Pokal

Statistics

Squad statistics

Goalscorers

Clean sheets

References

FC Schalke 04 seasons
Schalke